Missy Thomas Irvin (born February 12, 1971) is a Republican member of the Arkansas Senate, where she has served since 2011.

She serves on the Senate Ethics Committee. She and the committee rejected an ethics complaint against Kim Hendren over wage issues at his business. She and the committee censured Stephanie Flowers for calling a fellow legislator a dumbass.

Irvin and Jay Richardson introduced a bill to allow cyclists to yield at red lights and stop signs. It passed the legislature and was signed into law by Governor Asa Hutchinson.

References

Republican Party Arkansas state senators
People from Mountain View, Arkansas
Living people
Year of birth missing (living people)
Place of birth missing (living people)
Women state legislators in Arkansas
21st-century American women